Trichohippopsis is a genus of beetles in the family Cerambycidae, first described by Stephan von Breuning in 1958.

Species 
Trichohippopsis contains the following species:
 Trichohippopsis basilaris Botero & Santos-Silva, 2022
 Trichohippopsis birai Galileo & Santos-Silva, 2016
 Trichohippopsis gilmouri (Breuning, 1962)
 Trichohippopsis magna Martins & Carvalho, 1983
 Trichohippopsis rufula Breuning, 1958
 Trichohippopsis suturalis Martins & Carvalho, 1983
 Trichohippopsis unicolor Galileo & Martins, 2007
 Trichohippopsis vestitus Martins & Galileo, 2013

References

Agapanthiini